Anna R. Lydon (born July 29, 1980) is an American former soccer player who played as a defender, making six appearances for the United States women's national team.

Career
Kraus played for the Saint Francis Lancers in high school, and was named an NSCAA Youth All-American and the school's Scholar Athlete of the Year in her senior year. She also played club soccer for the Central Valley Mercury, winning three national titles with the team. In college, she played for the Santa Clara Broncos from 1998 to 2001. The team won the school's first NCAA championship in 2001, where she was named to the NCAA All-Tournament Team. She was also included in the All-West Region Second Team in 1998, 1999, and 2001, and was an All-WCC Second-Team Selection in 1999 and 2001. In total, she scored 2 goals and registered 10 assists in her 89 appearances for the Broncos.

Kraus made her international debut for the United States on July 7, 2000 in a friendly match against Italy. In total, she made six appearances for the U.S., earning her final cap on March 17, 2001 in a friendly match against Norway.

In the 2002 WUSA Draft, Kraus was selected by the Atlanta Beat before being traded later that year to the San Diego Spirit. She made nine appearances for San Diego during the 2002 WUSA season.

Personal life
Kraus was born in Mount Vernon, Washington, though she grew up in Sunnyvale, California, and attended Saint Francis High School in Mountain View. She married Keith Lydon in Incline Village, Nevada, on April 16, 2016.

Career statistics

International

References

External links
 Santa Clara player profile

1980 births
Living people
People from Mount Vernon, Washington
Soccer players from Washington (state)
Sportspeople from Sunnyvale, California
Soccer players from California
American women's soccer players
United States women's international soccer players
Women's association football defenders
Santa Clara Broncos women's soccer players
Women's United Soccer Association players
Atlanta Beat (WUSA) players
San Diego Spirit players